Monika Wielichowska (born 1973) is a Polish politician. She was elected to the Sejm in 2007, 2011, 2015, and 2019 in the Wałbrzych parliamentary constituency.

References

1973 births
Living people
People from Nowa Ruda
Civic Platform politicians
Members of the Polish Sejm 2007–2011
Members of the Polish Sejm 2011–2015
Members of the Polish Sejm 2015–2019
Members of the Polish Sejm 2019–2023
21st-century Polish women politicians